Kapilavastu may refer to:

Kapilavastu (ancient city), ancient city, the capital of Shakya
Taulihawa, Nepal, or Kapilavastu, municipality in Province No. 5, Nepal
Kapilvastu District, district of Province No. 5, Nepal